Eric Joseph Sakwa is a Ugandan politician and former Resident District Commissioner of Jinja District. He was the assistant youths leader of Uganda People's Congress in 2005, before joining National Resistance Movement in 2010. He was born in 1982. He has been remanded in prison for manslaughter and robbery charges during the enforcement of president Museveni's COVID-19 directives. He also called for interdiction in matters for illegal Jinja municipal land sale by civil servants. He was also put on two-month leave by the president until he was investigated on over manslaughter.

References

Ugandan politicians
1982 births
Living people